The men's shot put event at the 2002 Commonwealth Games was held on 30–31 July.

Medalists

Results

Qualification
Qualification: 18.20 m (Q) or at least 12 best (q) qualified for the final.

Final

References
Official results
Results at BBC

Shot
2002